Southern Pacific 2718 is a 2-8-0 "Consolidation" Class C-8 steam locomotive built by the Baldwin Locomotive Works in 1904 for the Southern Pacific Transportation Company (SP). It is one of three surviving members of its class, and one of many preserved SP 2-8-0s.

2718 spent its entire life working on the Southern Pacific for 52 years until November 1956, when it was retired and donated to Modoc County, California, where it is preserved on static display outdoors in Rachael Dorris Park, near the Modoc County Historical Museum in Alturas. While in service for the SP, 2718 was used on the route previously established by the Nevada–California–Oregon Railway (N.C.O.) between Alturas and Reno, Nevada, primarily pulling livestock freight trains, but also including passenger service between 1927 and 1938. 

The "Consolidation" class is named for the merger of the Beaver Meadow, Penn Haven & White Haven, and Lehigh & Mahanoy railroads, which became the Lehigh Valley Railroad.

See also 
 Southern Pacific 2706

References

External links 

 

2718
Baldwin locomotives
Railway locomotives introduced in 1904
2-8-0 locomotives
Preserved steam locomotives of California